Good Feeling may refer to:

(sorted by year)
 "Good Feeling", a 1981 song by Andy Gibb
 "Good Feeling", a 1983 song by Violent Femmes from Violent Femmes
 "Good Feeling", a 1995 song by Reef
 Good Feeling (Travis album), 1997
 "Good Feeling", a 2006 single by Soledad Brothers
 "Good Feeling" (song), 2011 song by Flo Rida
 The Good Feeling, 2011 album by the Christian McBride Big Band
 Good Feeling (Paul Carrack album), 2012
 Good Feeling (EP), 2012 EP by Flo Rida

See also
 That Good Feelin', 1959 album by Johnny "Hammond" Smith